John Regehr is a computer scientist specializing in compiler correctness and undefined behavior. , he is a professor at the University of Utah. He is best known for the integer overflow sanitizer which was merged into the Clang C compiler, the C compiler fuzzer Csmith, and his widely read blog Embedded in Academia. He spent the 2015-2016 academic year on sabbatical in Paris, France, working with TrustInSoft on Frama-C and related code analysis tools.

References

External links
 John Regehr's home page
 
 John Regehr on Mastodon

Living people
American computer scientists
University of Utah faculty
Science bloggers
Year of birth missing (living people)
University of Virginia alumni
Kansas State University alumni